Hopeful Gibbons  (4 October 1856 – 25 June 1947), known as Hope Gibbons, was a New Zealand businessman, philanthropist and local politician.

Born in Launceston, Tasmania, Australia on 4 October 1856 he arrived in New Zealand in 1862. He started in business on his own in 1879 by buying a run-down brewery but his principal businesses were the supply and distribution of bicycles and motorcycles throughout the country and Colonial Motor Company, which held the Ford franchise for the country and assembled their cars. From 1936 it ceased assembly but retained most metropolitan dealerships.

He was Mayor of Wanganui from 1924 to 1927.

Hope Gibbons married Jessie Barnes in 1881 and they had one daughter and four sons: Elsie Gibbons (1886-1960, married Alfred Gower), Hopeful Barnes Gibbons (1882–1955), Alfred Barnes Gibbons (1884–1961), Robert Barnes Gibbons (1889–1973) and Norman Barnes Gibbons (1891–1951). Hope Gibbon's Grandson Hopeful Hope Gibbons, by his eldest son Hope Gibbons, was killed serving as Second Lieutenant during World War II in 1941, serving with the Reserve Mechanical Transport Company of the New Zealand Army Service in Crete.

References

1856 births
1947 deaths
New Zealand businesspeople
New Zealand philanthropists
Australian emigrants to New Zealand
Mayors of Wanganui
New Zealand Members of the Order of the British Empire